Coffee Correctional Facility is a privately operated, medium-security prison for mostly men, owned and operated by CoreCivic under contract with the Georgia Department of Corrections.  The facility was built in 1998 in Nicholls, Coffee County, Georgia, and renovated in 2009.  

The maximum capacity of the prison is 3032 inmates.

References

Prisons in Georgia (U.S. state)
Buildings and structures in Coffee County, Georgia
CoreCivic
1998 establishments in Georgia (U.S. state)